Smíchov City (2020–2032) is a construction project planned on the site of one of the largest brownfields in Prague – the former freight railway station in Smíchov, which is almost 20 hectares in area. This entire new neighborhood, in preparation for the past 15 years, will be the largest single project in the history of the Czech Republic and will become a symbol of the transformation of Prague in the 21st century. The project's investor is the Sekyra Group. Construction began on September 30, 2020.

Description 
The project is the result of an international architectural competition and also takes into consideration the demands of individual Prague residents. The urban design of Smíchov City -  North and the plan for the SM 1 administrative complex were created by the studio A69. The design is grounded in the principles of a traditional city based on high-quality public space in the form of streets, parks, and squares bordered by city blocks, and is lively, safe, and beneficially multifunctional. The project includes plans for transit and parking, trees in the streets and inner courtyards, and a lively parterre. The space is intended to be a true home that will connect work, housing, shopping, school, and rest in one location. The neighborhood on the whole, which will connect fluidly with the surrounding buildings, is projected as a compact city space following a concept familiar in Western metropolises which allows the transit load to be reduced to a minimum. Based on the recommendations of a jury, seven studios will work on the project's architecture: A69, Kuba & Pilař architekti, Haascookzemmrich STUDIO 2050, Chalupa architekti, Lábus – AA – Architektonický ateliér, D3A, and Projektil architekti.

The plan calls for the construction of nearly 400,000 m² of residential, administrative, commercial, and public space, including a 28 m-wide urban pedestrian boulevard a kilometer in length running north to south across the entire neighborhood. The boulevard will be the centerpiece of the entire project and will serve as a meeting place. The project also includes a school and a total of 21,000 m² of green space, including Prague's answer to Hyde Park with an outdoor amphitheater. After the project's completion, scheduled for 2032, 12,000 people will live or work there. The total investment will be 776 million € (20 billion CZK).

The technology and energy efficiency of the buildings meets PENB requirements at a minimum of Category B. The new buildings are designed to receive BREEAM certificates for environmentally friendly structures. Outside of the northern section, which is restricted by metro and train tubes, the greater part of the energy will be drawn from sustainable sources: geothermal wells and photovoltaic power stations. A large portion of the rainwater will be reused to water the green spaces, and the buildings of Česká spořitelna will also recycle gray water.

The rules of the architectural competition were set by the Czech Chamber of Architects, and the Prague Institute of Planning and Development contributed to the instructions as well. In the opinion of the First Deputy Mayor of Prague, “the project prepared for this extensive area for a newly built urban neighborhood is a textbook exemplar for its first-class urban design and high-quality public space, as well as its architecture.” The developer's ambition is to create a new center for Prague that will become a modern alternative to the city's historical center. The buildings in both the first and second stages of construction will have stores, businesses, services, restaurants, and cafés open to the street on the ground floor. The future boulevard will be crossed by two parks 1.4 hectares in area.

A footbridge will lead from the pedestrian boulevard across the train tracks to a new train terminal whose construction will begin in 2021 and which is scheduled to be completed in 2025. The Smíchov Terminal will be Prague's first modern train station and serve as a unique transportation hub for 11 forms of transit used by a quarter million people every day. In addition to a metro station, the area will include terminals for both urban transit and long-distance lines, a bicycle parking lot, and a large parking lot for cars with a direct connection to the City Ring Road. The first parking garage to be built will have space for 1,000 cars and a terminal for suburban and long-distance buses on its roof. On part of the site of the current Na Knížecí bus station, the city of Prague is considering constructing a new building for the city hall that would host 2,000 officials currently working in the Škoda Palace once its lease ends in 2028. The Railway Administration will participate in the construction of the Smíchov Terminal, which is expected to get 4.5 billion CZK of public funding. The construction will preserve the historical concourse of the train station from the fifties which will connect two pedestrian underpasses. The Terminal will connect to other modernization projects like a three-track railway bridge across the Vltava, a new high-speed rail, the S Metro, and the electrification of bus transit and charging stations.

The neighborhood on the whole is planned as a multifunctional environment and allows for the possibility of setting up private schools, health facilities, and other services according to need. One unusual service planned for the project is the Financial Literacy Center in the headquarters of Česká spořitelna. A unique food court whose space opens up in part to a pedestrian zone will take inspiration from the great cities of Europe to offer a cross-section of international cuisine. Its design will extend the outdoor season. The project will also preserve the Radlická Kulturní Sportovna, a multifunctional athletic and cultural complex near Radlická Street created by locals from a disused railway warehouse.

Stage 1 
The first stage of construction will be the primarily residential section between Za Ženskými Domovy, Nádražní, and Stroupežníckého Streets as well as the extension of Na Valentince Street. The area will be turned into two blocks connected by a pedestrian zone. The first block will comprise the Na Knížecí administrative building and a compound made of nine residential buildings, while the second block will comprise a compound with nine residential buildings. This section will include a total of 400 apartments with underground garages and inner courtyards with gardens. Stage 1 will be approximately 27,000 m² in area and will see 3 billion CZK in investment. Construction began in September 2020. The construction of Stage 1 will be carried out by a consortium comprising Strabag, Aspira Construction, and Instalace Praha. The first 195 apartments and the Na Knížecí administrative building will be completed within two years.

Stage 2 
The second stage of the project is its southern portion, which will include investment from Česká spořitelna. The new headquarters of Česká spořitelna, which will be the workplace for 3,500 workers, will comprise up to half of the area of new construction. The plan for the southern tip of the boulevard includes a hotel, vacation residence buildings with hotel services, and another three administrative buildings with a total of 45,000 m² of construction. The competition to design the Česká spořitelna was won by an alliance of Baumschlager Eberle Architekten from Austria and the Czech studio Pavel Hnilička architekti. The hotel will be constructed according to a design by Henke Schreieck Architekten, while other buildings were designed by the Swedish studio Tham & Videgård and the German–Czech studio Schindler Seko Architects.
The project also includes the construction of the Smíchov City elementary school. The international competition for its design received 66 entries, from which the jury selected the plan of a Canadian–Polish team of architects (Nicolas Koff from the Toronto studio Ou and Zbigniew Gierszak of INOSTUDIO Architekti). Praha 5 has proposed naming the school for Karel Gott, who was a resident of Smíchov. The nearby park will have facilities for sporting activities.

The second phase currently does not have a construction permit, which the developer expects to receive by approximately 2023. In November 2020, the project received a positive environmental impact assessment, or EIA. Construction is set to begin in 2024 or 2025. The projected costs are 7.5 billion CZK.

See also 
 Luděk Sekyra

References

External links 
 Smíchov City on the Sekyra Group website

Buildings and structures under construction in the Czech Republic
Urban planning in the Czech Republic
Buildings and structures in Prague